Kingdom Come is the debut album by American/German hard rock band Kingdom Come.

The album reached Number 12 on the U.S. Billboard 200 and obtained Gold certification from the RIAA.

Track listing

Personnel
Kingdom Come
Lenny Wolf – lead vocals, producer
Danny Stag – lead guitar
Rick Steier – rhythm guitar, keyboards
Johnny B. Frank – bass
James Kottak – drums

Production
Bob Rock – producer, engineer, mixing at Electric Lady Studios, New York City
Tim Crich – engineer
Ken Steiger – mixing assistant
George Marino – mastering at Sterling Sound, New York City,
Hugh Syme – art direction, design

Charts

Album

Singles

Certifications

References

External links
 Kingdom Come lyrics

Kingdom Come (band) albums
1988 debut albums
Albums produced by Bob Rock
Polydor Records albums
Albums recorded at Little Mountain Sound Studios